The Morris Carnegie Library is a former library building in Morris, Minnesota, United States, now occupied by a historical society.  It was built in 1905 as one of the 2,500 Carnegie libraries funded by steel magnate Andrew Carnegie.  It was listed on the National Register of Historic Places in 1983 for having local significance in the themes of architecture and education.  It was nominated for being a longstanding focus of education in Morris, with locally distinctive and well preserved Neoclassical architecture.

The Morris Public Library relocated to a new facility in 1968.  The 1905 Carnegie building has since been maintained by the Stevens County Historical Society as its headquarters and museum.

See also
 List of Carnegie libraries in Minnesota
 List of museums in Minnesota
 National Register of Historic Places listings in Stevens County, Minnesota

References

1905 establishments in Minnesota
Buildings and structures in Stevens County, Minnesota
Carnegie libraries in Minnesota
Education in Stevens County, Minnesota
Libraries on the National Register of Historic Places in Minnesota
Library buildings completed in 1905
National Register of Historic Places in Stevens County, Minnesota
Neoclassical architecture in Minnesota